Weston-super-Mare Lifeboat Station is a lifeboat station at Weston-super-Mare in Somerset, England. For more than 100 years it was situated on Birnbeck Island but is now in a temporary building at Knightstone Harbour until a new lifeboat station can be built nearby. It is operated by the Royal National Lifeboat Institution (RNLI).

History

Birnbeck Island

The Bristol Channel has an extreme tidal range which made it difficult for the RNLI to find a site from which a lifeboat could be easily launched at all states of the tide. In 1882 they installed davits on the pier linking the mainland with Birnbeck Island, from which the town's first lifeboat to be launched like a ship's lifeboat into the water below, even at low tide.

A  slipway was brought into use in 1889, along with a new lifeboat house on the north east side of the island. This coincided with the delivery of a new lifeboat, as did the opening of the next lifeboat house in 1902.

On 12 March 1969 the Weston-super-Mare lifeboat, the Calouste Gulbenkian, was away for servicing when the temporary lifeboat, the Rachel and Mary Evans, broke away from a mooring off the pier and was wrecked on Birnbeck Island. Since this time Weston-super-Mare has only operated inshore lifeboats (ILBs), although ILBs have been stationed here since 1966.

A heavy storm in 1991 damaged a large part of the slipway. Repairs were undertaken by the following summer, with the two ILBs meanwhile moored afloat in the River Axe at Uphill. In 2007 the poor condition of the slipway again forced its closure. The launch site moved to an old slipway on the north side of the island. The crews continued to use the 1889 boathouse but the lifeboats were kept on their launch trolleys on Birnbeck Island outside the boathouse. In April 2011 a new "temporary" boathouse was erected to give them cover. This cost £70,000 but can be removed once permanent facilities can be provided again and then reused elsewhere.

Knightstone

The pier has been in poor condition for many years and has been closed to the public since 1994. The RNLI has laid boards on top of it to provide a safer access route for their volunteers but since December 2013 a portable building has been situated adjacent to the Marine Lake and the lifeboat can be launched using the slipway into Knightstone Harbour. This is not possible, however, at low tide. The larger lifeboat remained in the 'temporary' building on Birnbeck Pier for a while from which it could be launched when required at any state of the tide but only "when there is a significant risk to life". It has since joined the smaller D-class boat at Knightstone. In 2015 the RNLI announced that it would seek planning permission for a permanent lifeboat station at Knightstone Harbour along with deep-water anchorage at Anchor Head.

However it was revealed in 2020 that the RNLI could potentially take ownership of Birnbeck, which is subject to a compulsory purchase order by the local council.

Services
The first lifeboat at Weston-super-Mare was on station for seven years but it was only involved in two rescues, one of which involved taking 40 passengers off the SS Welsh Prince which got into difficulties after leaving Birnbeck Pier on 22 September 1884. In all, the pulling and sailing lifeboats that were stationed at Weston-super-Mare during the 51 years from 1882 to 1933 were only called out on 12 services and rescued 55 people. The motor lifeboats over the next 36 years were called out 104 times and rescued 89 people.

In common with other lifeboat stations, the number of service calls has increased significantly since the 1960s due to the rise in leisure craft and swimmers. A-504, the first large ILB, rescued 65 people in 172 services during its 13 years at Weston-super-Mare; the other ILBs have now made well over 1,000 service launches. Weston-super-Mare is the busiest RNLI station on the south side of the Bristol Channel. In 2010 it was called into action on 47 occasions, rescuing 27 people and also a dog which had fallen down a cliff; in 2011 there were 42 launches totalling 133 hours at sea and resulting in the rescue of 19 people.

Late in the evening of 13 September 1975, ILB A-504 was launched info a Force 9 gale in response to a report of red flares being seen off Brean Down, the promontory on the south side of Weston Bay. The crew found a motor boat on rocks in a cove below Brean Down, with people both in the water and on the cliff above the boat. An anchor was dropped and the lifeboat used the tide to bring it as close as possible to the shore, the motors being lifted out of the water to allow it to get as close in shore as possible. The people were then hauled through the water attached to a safety line. Helmsman Julian Morris was awarded an RNLI Bronze Medal for his outstanding seamanship, great skill and tremendous courage.

On the afternoon of 20 July 1986 Helmsman Morris took Weston Centenary to Brean Down to rescue two young boys who had been trapped by the tide, but he could only get to within  of the shore. For his bravery he was awarded the RNLI's 'Thanks on Velum'.

Area of operation

Fleet
'ON' is the RNLI's sequential Official Number; 'Op. No.' is the operational number painted onto the boat.

All weather lifeboats

Inshore lifeboats

A- and B-class

D-class

Notes

See also
 List of RNLI stations

References

Bibliography

External links

 Official station website
 RNLI station information

Lifeboat stations in Somerset
Buildings and structures in Weston-super-Mare